Audubon State Historic Site is a state park property in West Feliciana Parish, Louisiana, between the towns of St. Francisville and Jackson. It is the location where noted ornithologist and artist John James Audubon spent the summer of 1821.

Visitors come to see Oakley Plantation house, where Audubon lived at the time, and the surrounding plantation grounds. A portion of the  site contains the forest which served as a setting for many of the 32 Birds of America paintings that Audubon created or began while at Oakley.

Plantation house
Built circa 1806, the Oakley Plantation house is an example of early Anglo-American architecture in Louisiana, located on its historic site. Its interior rooms have been renovated in the style of the Federal period.

Audubon spent four months at the home in 1821, teaching Eliza Pirrie, the teen-aged daughter of the plantation's owners James Pirrie and Lucretia "Lucy" Alston (Pirrie), to draw. This is when he completed his nature drawings on the site.

The house was placed on the National Register of Historic Places in 1973 for its historical significance.

Photo gallery

See also
National Register of Historic Places listings in West Feliciana Parish, Louisiana
Locust Grove State Historic Site
Rosedown Plantation State Historic Site
List of Louisiana state historic sites

References

External links
Audubon State Historic Site Official web page
West Feliciana Historical Society Museum
West Feliciana Tourist Commission

Landmarks in Louisiana
Louisiana State Historic Sites
Protected areas of West Feliciana Parish, Louisiana
Museums in West Feliciana Parish, Louisiana
Historic house museums in Louisiana
Houses in West Feliciana Parish, Louisiana
National Society of the Colonial Dames of America
Slave cabins and quarters in the United States